Leonardo Josue Caracas Velásquez (April 21, 1992), better known as Leycang El Grandioso, is a singer, actor and composer of Reggaetón and urban pop, born in Maracaibo, Venezuela.

He recorded the song "Me muero por quererte" with the group Calibú, being nominated for the Pepsi Music Awards in the category "Merengue Tropical", and used as a youth theme for the telenovela by Venevisión, Natalia del Mar.

Life and career 
Leycang was born in Maracaibo, Zulia. However, at an early age he moved with his family to Trujillo, where he has lived most of his life. His parents are Elvia Rosa Velásquez and Enrique Caracas. Also, she has two sisters: Marianny Caracas and Isamar Caracas.

His artistic beginnings were from an early age, in 2011 he recorded the version  Merengue of the song "Me Muero Por Quererte" together with the Venezuelan group Calibú, by the hand of the producers Venezuelans Daniel & Yein and Subele Ram, this being the youth theme of the Venezuelan telenovela Natalia del Mar from Venevisión. His name was made known in various Venezuelan media, part of Colombia, Mexico and United States. At the end of 2013 he decided to make the new version of the song "Transportarte" together with Diego A., being recorded in El Castillo Records, which by 2014 was accepted by various radio stations in the region and was very supported by the general public.

Leycang released more than six songs, as well as various remixes. He released the song "Todo te lo di (Remix)" the track of which has amassed a total of more than a million plays on Spotify. He is also known for a number of collaborations with other artists and as a result has been featured on various record labels.

He participated in the mixtape "El Arsenal" by El Castillo Records, with his song "A Kilometros", that same year he recorded the song "Una Noche Mas" together with El Dainny and Joker & Gael, having a great reception in various parts of the country. Later, in 2019, the El Castillo Records label contacted him to record the song "Real"  a song in the style of Trap.

On 2021, Leycang joined with Colombian talent on this occasion with artist Andy Rowse, DJ DJFXNC and producer Jony Lams to bring "Teriyaki". According to the artists and producers this will be the first of several collaborations that are on the way since they have a good relationship both work and friendship, having a great feeling when it comes to making music. He also released "Massari", a dancehall fused with trap that tells a love story.

In March 2002, Leycang joins Puerto Rican El Josuet to release the song "Quererte Es Un Castigo".

On May 29, 2022, Leycang joins again with the Colombian Andy Rowse and on this occasion they release a video through the VEVO platform, titled "La Terraza".

Discography

Singles

Filmography

Acknowledgments

Pepsi Music Awards 
In 2012, the song "Me Muero Por Quererte", in which the band Calibu also collaborated, was nominated for the Pepsi Music Awards which reached number 12 in the Pepsi Ranking, where the artists Judy Buendia, Víctor Drija and Grupo Treo stood out among the first places.

Mara Internacional Awards 
He was nominated for the category "Emerging Urban Artist of the Year" at the Mara International Awards in 2019. Later on December 19, 2022, he was the winner in the category "Cantante Urbano de Proyección Internacional".

Ocammys Awards 
Leycang El Grandioso was named “Revelation Urban Artist” at the 2020 Ocammys Awards, held in July at the Canal I facilities.

Tacarigua de Oro Internacional Awards 
Leycang El Grandioso was the winner in the "Urban Artist Revelation" category. On December 14, 2022, Leycang was awarded in the category "Urban Artist with International Projection" at the Green Martini facilities (Sambil Caracas) in Caracas, Venezuela.

Turpial Golden Awards 
On April 27, 2022, Leycang was awarded in the category "Cantante Pop Urbano Impacto del Año" at the Turpial Golden Awards held at the Teatrex in Caracas, Venezuela.

International Silver Lucero Awards 
On June 17, 2022, Leycang was the winner of the Impact Urban Artist of the Year category at the International Silver Lucero Awards.

Latin Mara Internacional Awards 
On September 15, 2022, Leycang was the winner of the "Cantante Revelación de Música Urbana" category at the Latin Mara International awards held at the Green Martini facilities (Centro Sambil) in Caracas, Venezuela.

Venezuela de Oro Awards 
On November 15, 2022, he was the winner as "Urban Singer of the Year" at the Venezuela de Oro Awards held at the Baralt Theater in Maracaibo.

Tamanaco de Oro Awards 
On December 2, 2022, Leycang receives the award as "Urban Artist of International Projection" at the Tamanaco de Oro.

Music Artes Awards 
Leycang El Grandioso was nominated in the "Favorite Artist of the Year" category at the New York City Music Arts Awards.

References

External links

 
 
 

1992 births
Living people
People from Maracaibo
21st-century Venezuelan male singers
Venezuelan composers
Male composers
Latin pop singers
Venezuelan rappers